Mark Stratton John Matthew Smith (born December 6, 1956) is an American biblical scholar, anthropologist, and professor.

Early life and education
Born in Paris to Donald Eugene Smith and Mary Elizabeth (Betty) Reichert, Smith grew up in Washington, D.C. with his six sisters and two brothers. For elementary school, he attended Blessed Sacrament School. For grades 7–12, he went to St. Anselm's Abbey School.

Smith began his university studies at Johns Hopkins University receiving his B.A. in English in 1976. He received his Masters in theology at Catholic University of America in 1978. He received a Masters of Theological Studies, concentrating in biblical studies, at Harvard Divinity School, in 1981.

At Harvard, Smith studied with Frank Moore Cross, Thomas Lambdin, William Moran, and Michael D. Coogan. Primarily studying West Semitic languages and literatures, including the Hebrew Bible, Smith took an M.A. (1982), M.Phil. (1983), and Ph.D. (1985) in the Department of Near Eastern Languages and Literatures at Yale University. His advisor and director of his dissertation on Kothar-wa-Khasis, the Ugaritic craftsman god, was Marvin H. Pope, author of works on Ugaritic and biblical religion, including two commentaries in the Anchor Bible series on the Song of Songs and Job. At Yale, Smith also studied with Franz Rosenthal, Brevard Childs, Robert R. Wilson, and W. W. Hallo. While writing his dissertation, he studied at the Hebrew University for a year (1984–1985) under Jonas C. Greenfield.

Career
After graduate school, Smith focused on the history of Israelite and ancient Near Eastern religion. He also began to explore the representation of deities and divinity in the Hebrew Bible and the ancient Near East from the Bronze Age to the Greco-Roman period.  For several summers in the late 1980s and early 1990s, he also studied Dead Sea Scrolls with John Strugnell at the Ecole Biblique. This work issued in the publications of four manuscripts of the Dead Sea Scrolls.

Smith was the chair of Bible and Ancient Near Eastern Studies in the Department of Hebrew and Judaic Studies at New York University, and then came to be professor of Old Testament Literature and Exegesis at Princeton Theological Seminary.

Smith made many contributions to the study of the Hebrew Bible and Northwest Semitic texts as well as Ugaritic literature and religion.

Personal life
Smith has been married since 1983 to the archaeologist Elizabeth M. Bloch-Smith, author of Judahite Burials and Beliefs about the Dead. They have 3 children named Benjamin, Rachel, and Shulamit. Smith is a Roman Catholic.

Fellowships and honors
Golden Dozen Award for Excellence in Undergraduate Teaching, New York University, 2007
Frank Moore Cross Publications Award, American Schools of Oriental Research, 2005
Golden Dozen Award for Excellence in Undergraduate Teaching, New York University, 2001
Fellow, Center for Judaic Studies, University of Pennsylvania, 1998
Faculty Merit Award for Research, Saint Joseph's University, 1995
Morse Fellow, Yale University, 1993
Dorot Dead Sea Scrolls Fellow (summer), W. F. Albright Institute of Archeological Research, 1990
Mellon Faculty Fellowship Leave (spring term), Yale University 1989
Recipient of the Mitchell Dahood Memorial Prize 1988, 1990
Post-doctoral fellow W. F. Albright Institute of Archeological Research, 1988
Annual Professor, W. F. Albright Institute of Archeological Research, 1987
Mary Cady Tew prize for best first-year graduate student, Yale University, 1982

Additional positions
Member, Catholic Biblical Association of America, Society of Biblical Literature, Colloquium for Biblical Research, Old Testament Colloquium, and Association for Jewish Studies
Chairperson, Catholic Biblical Quarterly Monograph Series
Co-editor, Forschungen zum Alten Testament Series, published by Mohr Siebeck

Publications 
 Books

References

External links
NYU > Hebrew & Judaic > Mark S. Smith

American biblical scholars
Johns Hopkins University alumni
Catholic University of America alumni
Harvard Divinity School alumni
New York University faculty
Living people
Austin College faculty
1956 births
20th-century Roman Catholics
Old Testament scholars
People from Washington, D.C.
Princeton Theological Seminary faculty